Or or OR may refer to:

Arts and entertainment

Film and television 
 "O.R.", a 1974 episode of M*A*S*H
 Or (My Treasure), a 2004 movie from Israel (Or means "light" in Hebrew)

Music
 Or (album), a 2002 album by Golden Boy with Miss Kittin
 O*R, the original title of Olivia Rodrigo's album Sour, 2021
 "Or", a song by Israeli singer Chen Aharoni in Kdam Eurovision 2011
 Or Records, a record label
 Organized Rhyme, a Canadian hip-hop group featuring Tom Green

Businesses and organizations
 Or (political party), Israel
 OR Books, an American publisher
 Owasco River Railway, Auburn, New York, U.S. (by reporting mark)
 TUI fly Netherlands, formerly Arke, a Dutch charter airline (by IATA designator)

Language and linguistics 
 Or (digraph), in the Uzbek alphabet
 Or (letter) (or forfeda), in Ogham, the Celtic tree alphabet
 Odia language, an ancient Indo-Aryan tongue spoken in East India (ISO 639)
 Or, an English grammatical conjunction
 -or, an English agent noun suffix
 Or, a digraph in Taiwanese's Daī-ghî tōng-iōng pīng-im phonetic transcription

Places

Europe 
 Or (Crimea), an isthmus of the Black Sea
 Or (river), a tributary of the Ural
 Province of Oristano, Italy (by vehicle code)

United States 
 Oregon, a U.S. state (by postal abbreviation)
 Orange Line (Washington Metro)

Science, technology, and mathematics

Computing and mathematics
 Or (logic), logical disjunction
 Exclusive or (XOR), a logical operation
 Bitwise OR, an operator in computer programming, typically notated as or or |
 The short-circuit operator or, notated or, ||, or or else
 Elvis operator, an operator in computer programming that returns its first operand if its value is considered true, and its right operand if not
 Null coalescing operator, an operator in computer programming
 Onion routing, anonymous networking technique (also Onion Router)
 OR gate, an integrated circuit in electronics
 Object-relational mapping

Other uses in science and technology
 Odds ratio, a measure of effect size in statistics
 OR, a previous title of the Journal of the Operational Research Society
 Operating room, in medicine
 Operations research, or operational research, in British English
 Operations readiness

Titles and ranks 
 Official receiver, a statutory office holder in England and Wales
 Order of Roraima of Guyana, an award of the Republic of Guyana
 Other ranks, Denmark (disambiguation), military personnel in all branches of the Danish military that are not officers by the NATO system of ranks and insignia
 Other ranks (UK), personnel who are not commissioned officers, usually including non-commissioned officers (NCOs), in militaries of many Commonwealth countries

Other uses 
Or (name), Hebrew given name and surname
 Official Records of the American Civil War
 Olympic record, a term for the best performances in Olympic Games
 Or (heraldry), a gold or yellow tincture (from the French word for "gold")
 Own Recognizance, the basis for releasing someone awaiting trial without bail

See also 
 '0r' (zero r), meaning "no roods", in old measurements of land area
 And (disambiguation)
 OAR (disambiguation)
 Ore (disambiguation)
 Either/Or (disambiguation)